The New South Wales cricket team toured New Zealand from January to March 1890 and played five first-class matches and two minor matches.  New South Wales won four of the five first-class matches and drew the other and won both minor matches.  This was the first tour of New Zealand by New South Wales.

Team 

The following players were selected for the tour:

Matches

First-class matches

Minor matches

References 

New Zealand cricket seasons from 1890–91 to 1917–18
New South Wales representative sports teams
Cricket in New South Wales